Ernest Shields (August 5, 1884 – December 13, 1944) was an American actor of the silent era. He appeared in more than 110 films between 1914 and 1944. He was born in Chicago, Illinois and died in Los Angeles, California.

Selected filmography
 Lucille Love, Girl of Mystery (1914)
 The Broken Coin (1915)
 Behind the Lines (1916)
 It Can't Be True! (1916)
 The Voice on the Wire (1917)
 Mr. Dolan of New York (1917)
 The Reed Case (1917)
 The Birth of Patriotism (1917)
 The Double Room Mystery (1917)
 The Little Orphan (1917)
 The Purple Cipher (1920)
 Colleen of the Pines (1922)
 The Purple Riders (1922)
 The Ladder Jinx (1922)
 Rich But Honest (1927)
 Free Lips (1928)
 Woman Wise (1928)
 The Greyhound Limited (1929)
 Wives Never Know (1936)

References

External links

1884 births
1944 deaths
American male film actors
American male silent film actors
20th-century American male actors